Cylindrospermopsis is a planktonic genus of filamentous cyanobacteria known for its blooms in eutrophic waters. The type species is the tropical Cylindrospermopsis raciborskii (Woloszynska) Seenayya & Subbaraju. The cyanotoxin cylindrospermopsin was first identified from a species of this genus.

References

Nostocales
Cyanobacteria genera